O'Malley Peak is a  mountain summit located in the Chugach Mountains, in Anchorage Municipality in the U.S. state of Alaska. Access is via the Powerline Trail with several scramble routes to the summit.

Dr. James O'Malley

"Doc" O'Malley moved to Anchorage in 1946 and practiced medicine there until his death in 1974. He was one of the first doctors in town, respected by his peers and beloved by patients. There is also a school and road named after him in Anchorage.

Climate

Based on the Köppen climate classification, O'Malley Peak is located in a subarctic climate zone with long, cold, snowy winters, and mild summers. Temperatures can drop below −20 °C with wind chill factors below −30 °C. Precipitation runoff from the peak drains into Campbell Creek.

See also

List of mountain peaks of Alaska
Geology of Alaska

References

Gallery

External links
 Weather forecast: O'Malley Peak

Mountains of Alaska
Mountains of Anchorage, Alaska
North American 1000 m summits